Nolan is a given name, of Irish origin from Ó Nualláin, derived from Irish nuall meaning "absolute simp.
, famous" combined with a diminutive suffix.

People with the given name

A
Nolan Allan (born 2003), Canadian ice hockey player
Nolan D. Archibald (born 1943), American corporate executive
Nolan Arenado (born 1991), American baseball player
Nolan Arendse (born 1968), South African darts player
Nolan B. Aughenbaugh (born 1928), American professor

B
Nolan Baumgartner (born 1976), Canadian ice hockey player
Nolan Bushnell (born 1943), American entrepreneur

C
Nolan Carroll (born 1987), American football player
Nolan Clark (born 1984), South African rugby union footballer
Nolan Clarke (born 1948), Dutch cricketer
Nolan Cooney (born 1996), American football player
Nolan Cromwell (born 1955), American football coach
Nolan Crouse, Canadian politician

E
Nolan Evans (1885–1948), English footballer

F
Nolan Flemmer (1938–2018), South African cricketer
Nolan Fontana (born 1991), American baseball player
Nolan Foote (born 2000), American-Canadian ice hockey player
Nolan Franz (born 1959), American football player
Nolan Frese (born 1992), American football player
Nolan Frizzelle (1921–2013), American politician
Nolan Gerard Funk (born 1986), Canadian actor

G
Nolan Gasser (born 1964), American composer
Nolan Godfrey (born 1981), American lacrosse player
Nolan Gould (born 1998), American actor
Nolan Gorman (born 2000), American baseball player
Nolan Gottlieb (born 1982), American basketball player

H
Nolan Bailey Harmon (1892–1993), American bishop
Nolan Harrison (born 1969), American football player
Nolan Heavenor (born 1982), Canadian lacrosse player
Nolan Hemmings (born 1970), English actor
Nolan Henke (born 1964), American golfer
Nolan Hickman (born 2003), American basketball player
Nolan Hoffman (born 1985), South African cyclist

J
Nolan Jones (born 1998), American baseball player

K
Nolan Karras (born 1944), American politician
Nolan Kasper (born 1989), American alpine skier
Nolan Keeley (born 1951), English footballer

L
Nolan Laufenberg (born 1999), American football player
Nolan Leary (1889–1987), American actor
Nolan Luhn (1921–2011), American football player

M
Nolan MacMillan (born 1990), Canadian American football player
Nolan Mbemba (born 1995), French footballer
Nolan McCarty (born 1967), American political scientist
Nolan McDonald (born 1977), Canadian ice hockey player
Nolan McGuire, American guitarist
Nolan McKenzie (born 1969), Guyanese cricketer
Nolan McLean (born 2001), American baseball player
Nolan Mettetal (1945–2020), American politician
Nolan Miller (1933–2012), American fashion designer
Nolan Miller (author) (1907–2006), American author

N
Nolan North (born 1970), American voice actor

P
Nolan Patrick (born 1998), Canadian hockey player
Nolan Porter (born 1949), American singer-songwriter
Nolan Pratt (born 1975), Canadian ice hockey player

Q
Nolan Quinn (born 1983), Canadian politician

R
Nolan Reimold (born 1983), American baseball player
Nolan Richardson (born 1941), American basketball coach
Nolan Richardson III (1964–2012), American basketball coach
Nolan Roux (born 1988), French footballer
Nolan Ryan (born 1947), American baseball player

S
Nolan Sanburn (born 1991), American baseball player
Nolan Schaefer (born 1980), Canadian ice hockey player
Nolan Seegert (born 1992), German ice skater
Nolan Shaheed (born 1949), American musician
Nolan Siegel (born 2004), American racing driver
Nolan Sipe, American songwriter
Nolan Smith (born 1988), American basketball player
Nolan Smith (American football) (born 2001), American football player
Nolan Sotillo (born 1994), American singer-songwriter
Nolan Swancy (1896–1964), American baseball player
Nolan Stierle (2002), Lacrosse player

T
Nolan Tash (born 1977), Trinidadian volleyball player
Nolan Thiessen (born 1980), Canadian curler
Nolan Thomas, American musician
Nolan Tupaea, New Zealand rugby league footballer
Nolan Turner (born 1997), American football player

V
Nolan Van Way (born 1931), American baritone

W
Nolan Wallach (born 1940), American mathematician
Nolan Watson (born 1979), Canadian businessman
Nolan Watson (baseball) (born 1997), American baseball player
Nolan West (born 1990), American politician
Nolan White (1931–2002), American racing driver
Nolan Williams (disambiguation), multiple people
Nolan Wirth (born 1995), Canadian soccer player

Y
Nolan T. Yelich (born 1942), American librarian
Nolan Yonkman (born 1981), Canadian ice hockey player
Nolan Young, Canadian politician

See also
Nolan (surname), a page for people with the surname "Nolan"
Nolan (disambiguation), a disambiguation page for "Nolan"

References

English-language masculine given names
Given names originating from a surname
English masculine given names
Irish masculine given names